Rathbones Group Plc is a UK provider of personalised investment management and wealth management services for private investors and trustees. This includes discretionary investment management, unit trusts, tax planning, trust and company management, pension advice and banking services. The company is listed on the London Stock Exchange and is a constituent of the FTSE 250 Index.

History

The business was founded by William Rathbone II by 1742 as a Liverpool-based timber trading business. In the 19th century it became a leading trader in cotton from the United States and in 1841 it became the Liverpool agent for the East India Company. In 1912 it abandoned its trading operations and focused on financial management, initially for the Rathbone family, but subsequently for the general public. In 1988 it merged with Comprehensive Financial Services Ltd to form Rathbone Brothers plc and thereby secured a listing on the London Stock Exchange. It changed its name from Rathbone Brothers to Rathbones Group on 1 December 2021.

Operations
The company provides investment management, financial planning, tax and trust services. It has 14 offices located all over the UK and Jersey.

The current CEO is Paul Stockton, who was appointed to the position in May 2019. He had previously worked at the company from 2008, as group financial and managing director.

Responsible business 
The Rathbones Group Foundation is the charitable arm of the group, supporting charities that pay particular attention to at risk and vulnerable youths.

References

Further reading
David Lascelles (2008) The Story of Rathbones since 1742. London: James & James (Publishers) Ltd
Lucy Nottingham (1992) Rathbone Brothers  From Merchant to Banker 1742-1992, Rathbone Brothers plc.
Sheila Marriner (1961) Rathbones of Liverpool  1845-73 Liverpool University Press

External links
 Official site

Companies based in Liverpool
Investment management companies of the United Kingdom
Financial services companies established in 1742
Companies listed on the London Stock Exchange
Financial services companies based in the City of London
Rathbone family
British companies established in 1742